Gunnar Bech (March 23, 1920 in Græse, Frederikssund Municipality – January 17, 1981 in Copenhagen) was a Danish linguist. His magnum opus was Studies on the German Verbum Infinitum (Bech 1955/1957, reprinted 1983). It is perhaps the most widely cited single work on the German verb.

Partial list of written works 
 
 Zur Syntax des tschechischen Konjunktivs. Kopenhagen 1951, at the same time: Phil. Diss. (Dissertation writing)
 Das germanische reduplizierte Präteritum (Det Kongelige Danske Videnskabernes Selskab, Historisk-filosofiske Meddelelser 44, no. 1, p. 1–54), Munksgaard København, 1969.

References 

Linguists from Denmark
1920 births
1981 deaths
People from Frederikssund Municipality
20th-century linguists